The Tyers River is a perennial river of the West Gippsland catchment, located in the West Gippsland region of the Australian state of Victoria.

Course and features
The river descends  over its  course.

The Tyers River is impounded by the Moondarra Reservoir, at the junction of the Tyers River and Jacobs Creek. The  reservoir is predominantly used to augment domestic water supplies.

The Tyers River sub-catchment area is managed by the West Gippsland Catchment Management Authority.

See also

 Rivers of Victoria

References

External links
 
 

West Gippsland catchment
Rivers of Gippsland (region)